Tachysurus is a genus of bagrid catfishes found in eastern Asia and as a fossil in Africa.  The currently recognized species in this genus are:
 Tachysurus argentivittatus (Regan, 1905)
 Tachysurus brashnikowi (L. S. Berg, 1907) (Brazhnikov's catfish)
 Tachysurus dumerili (Richardson, 1846) (Chinese longsnout catfish) →Leiocassis longirostris is a synonym.
 Tachysurus fulvidraco (J. Richardson, 1846) (yellowhead catfish or Korean bullhead)
 Tachysurus herzensteini (L. S. Berg, 1907) (Herzenstein's catfish)
 Tachysurus hoi (Pellegrin & P. W. Fang, 1940)
 Tachysurus longispinalis (V. H. Nguyễn, 2005)
 Tachysurus nitidus (Sauvage & Dabry de Thiersant, 1874)
 Tachysurus nudiceps (Sauvage, 1883)
 Tachysurus sinensis Lacépède, 1803
 Tachysurus spilotus H. H. Ng, 2009
 Tachysurus virgatus (Ōshima, 1926)
Tachysurus landanensis (fossil)

References

Bagridae
Fish of Asia
Catfish genera
Taxa named by Bernard Germain de Lacépède
Freshwater fish genera